Justin Edward Spring (born March 11, 1984) is a retired American gymnast. He is a member of the bronze medal winning U.S. team at the 2008 Olympics in Beijing.  He was also a top gymnast in NCAA competition, where he represented the University of Illinois.

Personal life
Spring was born in Houston, Texas and raised in Burke, Virginia.  He graduated from  Lake Braddock Secondary School in Burke, VA in 2002.  His father Sherwood Spring is a retired NASA astronaut. His sister, Sarah, was also a highly decorated collegiate gymnast at The Ohio State University in Columbus, OH from 2000 to 2004.

On May 29, 2010, Spring married fellow Illinois alumna Tori Tanney.

Justin and Tori welcomed their first Child, Cody, in July 2012.

Competition career

High school and collegiate career
Spring began his coaching career in 2010 with the University of Illinois men's gymnastics program. Spring, one of the Illinois's most talented gymnasts, finished his competitive career in 2006, and since then he has led the Orange and Blue to Big Ten and NCAA Championship titles in his role as head coach.

In 2006, Spring strung together one of the best seasons in Illinois gymnastics' history, which culminated in earning the 2006 Nissen-Emery Award, an honor that goes to the top senior male gymnast in the nation. A double titlist at the 2006 NCAAs, Spring took home the crown in the high bar and defended his title in parallel bars. In addition, he carded five total All-America honors with a second-place finish in all-around, third on floor exercise and fourth on vault.

Along with his individual honors, Spring helped the Illini to runner-up finishes at the 2006 NCAA and Big Ten Championships. The finish at NCAAs came half-a-point shy of team-champion Oklahoma, and just short of the Orange and Blue's 10th national title.

Overall, the Burke, Va., native is a four-time NCAA Champion, winning a pair of titles on high bar in both 2004 and 2006 and back-to-back crowns on parallel bars in 2005 and 2006. Along with his national recognition, Spring earned 2006 Big Ten Gymnast of the Year accolades after winning the all-around crown at the Big Ten Championships. In all, Spring finished his illustrious career being named to the All-Big Ten first team three times, grabbed Big Ten Gymnast of the Week laurels six times and earned Inside Gymnastics' NCAA Gymnast of the Week honors three times.

During his four-year career, Spring garnered three Big Ten Championships with titles on parallel bars and all-around in 2006 and on the floor exercise in 2004. Spring is a two-time recipient of the Dike Eddleman Athlete of the Year award (2004, 2006), which goes to Illinois' top male and female athlete. A face and name that will forever be remembered in Illini record books, Spring left the Fighting Illini a 12-time All-American, the most since Abie Grossfeld earned 12 from 1957–59, and holds the Illinois record on the floor exercise, vault, parallel bars and high bar.

Overall in his collegiate career, he is
 2006 Nissen-Emery Award winner
 2006 NCAA Parallel Bars Champion
 2006 NCAA High Bar Co-Champion
 2006 Big Ten Gymnast of the Year
 2006 Big Ten Parallel Bars Champion
 2006 Big Ten All-Around Champion
 2005 U.S. National High Bar Champion
 2005 NCAA Parallel Bars Champion
 2004 NCAA High Bar Champion
 2004 Big Ten Floor Exercise Champion
 12-time All-American
 Three-time All-Big Ten Team Member
 Six-time Big Ten Gymnast of the Week
 Three-time Inside Gymnastics NCAA Gymnast of the Week
 Two-time UI Dike Eddleman Athlete of the Year (2004, 2006)
 Illinois School Record Holder (FX, VT, PB, HB)
 Two-Year Team Captain

International career
Spring has also competed internationally representing the United States.

He represented the U.S. at the 2005 World Artistic Gymnastics Championships in Melbourne, Australia on floor exercise, parallel bars and high bar as a member of the 2005 U.S. National Team. At 2005 World Championships, Spring finished 10th to qualify as a reserve on high bar and finished 12th on parallel bars. In 2005, Spring became the first Illini to ever win a U.S. National title with his two-day combined high bar score of 18.750, while also scoring a 9.500 on high bar at the 2005 American Cup to take home the silver medal behind Olympic champion Paul Hamm.

The Illini gymnast finished fourth on the high bar at the 2004 Visa U.S. Championships with scores of 9.600 and 9.650 in the two-day format, and competed for Team USA at the 2003 World University Games in Daegu, South Korea, advancing to the finals on floor. In 2006, Spring garnered a selection to the 2006 Men's World Championships team, but had to withdraw due to injury. Spring graduated from the University of Illinois in 2006 with a bachelor's degree in speech communication.

He is a three-time U.S. Senior National Team Member, a 2005 U.S. World Championships Team Member, the 2005 Visa U.S. Championships High Bar Champion, the 2005 Winter Cup High Bar Champion, the 2005 American Cup High Bar Silver Medalist, the 2003 World University Games Team Member

Spring tore his anterior cruciate ligament at the 2007 Visa Championships.

Spring was named to the U.S. Olympic Gymnastic team on June 22, 2008.  He performed very well at the Olympics, and was a key part of the United States Team's bronze medal victory, posting high scores on the vault, parallel bars, high bar, and the floor exercise.  His high-flying horizontal bar routine in team finals was particularly impressive, and included a stuck triple-back dismount and scored 15.675.

Spring's resemblance to Prince Harry has earned him the nickname Prince.

Retirement
In 2010 Spring was named Head Coach of the Illinois Fighting Illini men's gymnastics.  He has indicated that the new position will require him to retire from the sport.

Spring also became a spokesperson for the skincare line Proactiv.

Coaching career

Head coaching record 

Following the 2009–10 season, Spring was named head coach for the Illinois men's gymnastics program after spending one year as an associate head coach. Spring handles all of the gym coaching duties along with assistant coaches Ivan Ivankov and 2010 graduate Luke Stannard.

In one season as associate head coach, Spring led Illinois to its second-straight Big Ten team title and a fourth-place finish at the NCAA Championships. Individually, five Illini earned All-America accolades, three took home Big Ten titles and Stannard became just the third Illini to win the prestigious Nissen-Emery Award, which is presented annually to the nation's top senior male gymnast.

Additionally, Spring helped guide Illinois to a 22–5 overall record and the top spot in the rankings on four separate occasions and never dropped out of the top five. For his efforts, Spring was honored as both Central Region Coach of the Year and Big Ten Coach of the Year.

Spring was promoted to associate head coach following the 2009 season after three years as an assistant under the legendary Yoshi Hayasaki. The promotion meant that Spring had to retire from competitive gymnastics to concentrate on coaching full-time.

In 2009, Spring was named Central Region Assistant Coach of the Year along with Ivankov after helping Illinois to the Big Ten Championship, a fifth-place finish at the NCAA Championships and three individual NCAA titles.

In 2012, Spring helped University of Illinois Fighting Illini win the NCAA national championship in Gymnastics.
https://web.archive.org/web/20120430011148/http://www.fightingillini.com/sports/m-gym/recaps/042012aaj.html

References

External links
 
 
 
 
 

1984 births
Living people
College men's gymnastics coaches in the United States
Gymnasts at the 2007 Pan American Games
Gymnasts at the 2008 Summer Olympics
Olympic bronze medalists for the United States in gymnastics
Sportspeople from Fairfax County, Virginia
People from Houston
American male artistic gymnasts
Medalists at the 2008 Summer Olympics
Illinois Fighting Illini men's gymnasts
Illinois Fighting Illini men's gymnastics coaches
Pan American Games bronze medalists for the United States
Pan American Games medalists in gymnastics
People from Burke, Virginia
Medalists at the 2007 Pan American Games